Byron Peak is a  mountain in the U.S. state of Alaska, located in Chugach National Forest.

Location 
Byron Peak is located in the Chugach National Forest at the head of a short, steep-walled valley, and rises above Portage Lake.

Outdoor Recreation
Due to relative ease of access and proximity to the major population centers of Alaska, Byron Peak and the surrounding area is a popular destination for mountain climbers, hikers, and, occasionally, skiers. The Byron Glacier Trail is a short and easy walk to the base of Byron Peak, and offers visitors panoramic views of steep glaciated mountains and Portage Lake. Continuing upward from the floor of the valley toward the peak requires technical skill and climbing equipment.

Accidents and Fatalities

Byron Peak has been the site of several tragic accidents.
 September 2006; one climber killed in a fall into a glacial crevasse 
 February 2004; one climber killed in a cornice break avalanche near the summit
 August 1996; one young climber, the daughter of a well-known leader in Alaska's outdoor community, killed in a fall

References

External links
 Byron Peak Weather forecast

Mountains of Anchorage, Alaska
Mountains of Kenai Peninsula Borough, Alaska
Mountains of Alaska